Individual Thought Patterns is the fifth studio album by American death metal band Death, released on June 22, 1993, by Relativity Records. It is the only album by the band to feature guitarist Andy LaRocque, the first to feature drummer Gene Hoglan and the second and last to feature bassist Steve DiGiorgio. Manager Eric Greif described the album as "an angry record, angry lyrically", attributing it to his conflict with Chuck Schuldiner at the time.

DiGiorgio recalled working with LaRocque as a notable experience: Schuldiner only wanted LaRocque to play solo sections, so he only sent LaRocque the few bars of the songs where the solo would be. LaRocque would then arrive at the studio without much preparation, and largely improvised the solos, impressing everyone. In a 2021 interview, LaRocque would downplay this account, saying that he did prepare multiple ideas and alternate melody lines for each solo.

The album contains the track "The Philosopher", for which a music video was made that received significant airplay on MTV and was even featured on, and comically panned by, Beavis and Butt-Head where the duo mistake the boy in the video for "Jeremy" from the Pearl Jam video and mock Schuldiner's vocals. The album is included in Guitar Player Magazines Metal Guitar albums top 20. The album was reissued and remixed by Relapse Records in October 2011.

Critical reception

Jason Arnopp of Kerrang! in his positive review considered Individual Thought Patterns the band's best album since Leprosy from 1988, attributing it in parts to band leader Chuck Schuldiner's choice of personnel. Arnopp noted especially Gene Hoglan's drumming and the guitar work of Schuldiner and Andy LaRocque, concluding that together with bassist Steve Di Giorgio "they create an altogether heavier din than was the case with last year's 'Human' album, while still adding Trad Metal/Progressive touches in an almost surreal fashion."

Track listing
All songs written by Chuck Schuldiner.

Personnel
All information is taken from the CD liner notes of the original 1993 release and the 2011 reissue.

Death
 Chuck Schuldiner – vocals, lead and rhythm guitar
 Andy LaRocque – lead guitar
 Steve Di Giorgio – fretless bass
 Gene Hoglan – drums, guitars on "The Exorcist"

Additional musicians
 Ralph Santolla – guitars (on Live in Germany performances)

Production
 Scott Burns – production, engineering
 Chuck Schuldiner – production
 René Miville – artwork
 David Bett – art direction
 Kathy Milone – design
 Jacob Speis – layout
 Alan Douches – mastering, remixing (2011 reissue)
 Jamal Ruhe – remixing (2011 reissue)

Charts

References

External links 
 Lyrics @ Death official site

1993 albums
Death (metal band) albums
Relativity Records albums
Relapse Records albums
Albums produced by Scott Burns (record producer)
Albums recorded at Morrisound Recording